Myrichthys is a genus of snake eels currently containing 11 recognized species found in tropical and warm temperate oceans worldwide.

Species
 Myrichthys aspetocheiros McCosker & Rosenblatt, 1993 (longfin spotted snake-eel)
 Myrichthys breviceps (J. Richardson, 1848) (Sharptail eel)
 Myrichthys colubrinus (Boddaert, 1781) (harlequin snake-eel)
 Myrichthys maculosus (Cuvier, 1816) (tiger snake-eel)
 Myrichthys magnificus (C. C. Abbott, 1860) (magnificent snake-eel)
 Myrichthys ocellatus (Lesueur, 1825) (gold-spotted eel)
 Myrichthys paleracio McCosker & G. R. Allen, 2012
 Myrichthys pantostigmius D. S. Jordan & E. A. McGregor, 1898 (clarion snake-eel)
 Myrichthys pardalis (Valenciennes, 1839) (leopard eel)
 Myrichthys tigrinus Girard, 1859 (spotted snake-eel)
 Myrichthys xysturus (D. S. Jordan & C. H. Gilbert, 1882)

References

 

 
Ophichthidae
Marine fish genera
Taxa named by Charles Frédéric Girard